SLOSHSAT-FLEVO (Sloshsat Facility for Liquid Experimentation and Verification in Orbit) is a microsatellite launched to investigate the dynamics of fluids in microgravity. FLEVO stands for Facility for Liquid Experimentation and Verification in Orbit. Multiple sensors were used to monitor the behavior of water in an instrumented tank and how sloshing affects the attitude control of launchers and space vehicles.

The project is a joint program between ESA, the Netherlands Agency for Aerospace Programmes, and the Israel Space Agency. The primary contractor is the National Aerospace Laboratory providing the spacecraft structure and power systems. The ejection system and ground support equipment were contracted by NEWTEC. The ISA was responsible for supplying the sub-propulsion system which was built and assembled by Rafael.

Spacecraft

The spacecraft itself is a 90-cm cube microsatellite covered by solar cells and fitted with 12 small thrusters.

Launch
Originally Sloshsat-FLEVO was to be launched from the Space Shuttle and use the shuttle as a data relay, but after the Space Shuttle Columbia disaster the satellite was modified to be launched on board the Ariane-5 qualification flight.
The satellite was launched from the Guiana Space Centre launch site at Kourou, French Guiana on 12 February 2005.

Experiment
The SLOSHSAT-FLEVO is the first satellite entirely dedicated to liquid research in space. The satellite was equipped with an 87-litre cylindrical tank containing 33.5 litres of de-ionised water. 270 sensors were placed on the tank's walls to measure the sloshing behavior by calculating the thickness of the water. Three accelerometers and a fibre-optic gyroscope were used to measure the motion of the spacecraft. An array of temperature, pressure and fluid velocity sensors were also installed on the craft.

After depletion of the propellants and completion of the experiment, the satellite was turned off. The satellite had a lifetime of around 14 days. ESA estimate that without active debris removal the orbit would decay by 2335.

See also

 European Space Agency
 Israel Space Agency

References

External links
 Shimshon Adler, Abraham Warshavsky, and Arie Peretz.  "Low-Cost Cold-Gas Reaction Control System for the Sloshsat FLEVO Small Satellite", Journal of Spacecraft and Rockets, Vol. 42, No. 2 (2005), pp. 345–351. https://doi.org/10.2514/1.5128

Spacecraft launched in 2005
Satellites orbiting Earth
Satellites of Israel
2005 in Israel